Dream Castle is the eighth studio album by the artist Vektroid under the one time alias Tanning Salon released on December 3, 2011. The album is an example of both lo-fi and ambient music genres. Although not one of Vektroid's more popular works, it remains among her most critically acclaimed. The album has had releases on vinyl, however some of the releases have been unofficial.

Track listing

References

Vektroid albums
2011 albums
Ambient albums by American artists